Richa Ahuja (born 16 September 1973) is a former Indian actress. She has acted in Hindi, Tamil, English, and French films and plays.

Career
Richa is the daughter of New Delhi-based vocalist and playwright, Sushma Ahuja, and a Pakistani Hindu father. Richa Ahuja acted in several plays right from her childhood through her acting career on screen. She made her first film appearance in Praying with Anger (1991), an experimental English film, which also marked the directorial debut of M. Night Shyamalan during his days as a student. She then moved on to perform in Hindi and English theatre as well as projects in Chennai, where she lived. She also trained under Ebrahim Alkazi, the founder of the National School of Drama New Delhi, when he formed the Living Theater Academy of Drama and featured in six of his productions. At the same time, she worked as a video jockey for Mirch Masala of Plus Channel, interviewing prominent actors such as Chiranjeevi and Nagarjuna. Subsequently, she began to receive offers to play roles in Hindi televisions serials and appeared in Parampara, Safar, Sathya and Shanti. She then got an offer for a Tamil serial, Suzhal and relocated to Chennai, after which she also featured in Oviyam and Panam Penn Pasam.

Richa had been looking to get a breakthrough in film roles, and an offer from Mani Ratnam also did not eventually materialize. She then appeared in her mother Sushma Ahuja's directorial venture, the 1998 romantic film Uyirodu Uyiraga, featuring Richa alongside Ajith Kumar. Richa took up the offer, after another popular actress had opted out of the role due to date issues. Singeetam Srinivasa Rao, with whom Sushma worked in the silent movie Pushpak, encouraged Richa to take up this project. The film was reportedly based on a real event which had occurred in the early 1990s. 
The film released to positive reviews from film critics. A reviewer praised the film as "a clean movie with no masala stuff" but criticized the "weak story-line", while also praising the performances in the film. During a holiday to France, she became involved in a French adaptation of Girish Karnad's play Hayavadana and subsequently learnt the language and appeared on stage for the play 45 times. She then relocated to France to feature in a film titled Le Mystère Parasuram (1999), which took two years in production. Despite the average success of her previous Tamil film, her next Tamil venture, Mani Ratnam's Dumm Dumm Dumm saw her feature alongside Madhavan and Jyothika in a secondary supporting role. She had earlier been in touch with the production studio, Madras Talkies, for a potential lead role.

Richa married Kash Badami on 14 February 2002 and has 3 children.

Filmography

See also

 List of Indian actresses

References

External links 
 

Living people
20th-century Indian actresses
21st-century Indian actresses
Actresses from New Delhi
Actresses in Hindi cinema
Actresses in Hindi television
Actresses in Tamil cinema
Indian film actresses
Indian stage actresses
Indian television actresses
1973 births